Metaform (born Justice Aaron) is an American music producer, musician, and songwriter with numerous LP and EP releases.  He is considered to be a prominent figure in the development of instrumental Hip-Hop and Trance. He first gained acclaim in 2008 with the release of his debut album Standing on the Shoulders of Giants, which was created entirely from old vinyl samples.

Biography

Metaform grew up in Los Angeles in a musical household. His Dad was an avid listener of Leonard Cohen, Simon & Garfunkel, and Ravi Shankar records, while his Mom listened to Whitney Houston and Curtis Mayfield. Metaform's parents divorced in 1988 and soon after, he moved to San Francisco with his mother and three sisters. He spent the year of 1998 as an intern at Spark Studios in Oakland, California. During this time, he gained experience by working with E-40, Tone Capone, and Scarface. He spent the year of 1999 shipping records for TRC distribution. During this time, he delved deeper into the already buzzing Bay-Area Hip-Hop scene. From 2000 to 2005, he worked as a free-lance sound engineer and worked with many high-profile acts including:
DJ Jazzy Jeff, Afrika Bambaataa, Pharcyde, Hieroglyphics, Living Legends, Goapele, Zion I, and many others. He graduated from San Francisco State University in 2005 before moving back to Los Angeles and eventually to Tokyo.

Metaform began playing piano at the age of 7, and guitar at age 13. By the time he turned 16, Metaform formed a heavy metal band with two of his classmates. The band mostly played Metallica and Slayer covers. At age 18, Metaform joined the now defunct San Francisco punk rock band, The Breakouts, as rhythm guitar and they played at several club shows in San Francisco. After The Breakouts, Metaform met 4X-ampL (who now resides in Montreal) during an audio engineering class. The two quickly became friends and formed the rock group Team USA (along with Casten on drums) and Metaform played the guitar and also contributed towards vocals. Later, Metaform and 4X-ampL formed the electronica duo Razed High. During this time, Metaform was known as Hai-Ding, a play on words in that he was "in hiding" and working on what would later become Standing on the Shoulders of Giants.

Justice Aaron has lived and worked in Tokyo, Japan, since July 2006.

Major works

Standing on the Shoulders of Giants
His instrumental opus, Standing on the Shoulders of Giants, was released on April 15, 2008, which spent the entire month of May on the College Music Journal's top 20. It was produced and engineered by Metaform at his various home studios over a five-year period in which he kept in deep isolation, it is hailed as one of the top ten records of 2008 by Eddie Fleisher of Alternative Press Magazine. Since its release, the album has received praise in major publications including URB, REMIX, XLR8R, and Alternative Press.  Alternative Press reviewed the album as "One of the best instrumental hip-hop records in years." while JIVE Magazine noted "Metaform takes the listener on an audible journey that few other
producers are capable."

Beats from the Crypt: Early Works
Released in the same year as "Standing...", this LP of B-sides and rarities was adored by fans of the first album in that it was also constructed primarily from samples.  The album cover shows an early desk work station which was used by the artist for late night writing sessions.  This record is also where he first exposes his voice on such tracks as "Right Next to You" and "Blue Skies".

The Electric Mist
Released June 15, 2010, The Electric Mist represented Metaform's break from traditional sample/loop based song writing into original synth-based song construction.  The record was met with mixed reactions by existing fans, and ushered in a new audience who was attracted by the dark and sexy electro-pop sound.  The Electric Mist was featured on the popular torrent site "Demonoid" where it was released for free by Justice Aaron, and remained in the top 10 music list for 2 years being downloaded over 300,000 times.

The Midnight Machine
A science fiction opera trilogy which Justice began developing in 2009.  Act 1 will be released on June 4, 2013.

References

External links

Official Website
Metaform Interview from October 2008 on Comfortcomes.com
Metaform Interview from February 2009 on Urbnet.com
Metaform in REMIX Perfect 10
Metaform from XLR8R Guest Reviews
Metaform featured on Blogarythms
Metaform Myspace
LAST.FM

Record producers from California
Year of birth missing (living people)
Singers from Los Angeles
San Francisco State University alumni
Songwriters from California
Living people